Romulus is a 2007 comic opera in one act by Louis Karchin based on an 1854 play by Alexandre Dumas, père; the libretto is by Barnett Shaw, based upon his own translation of the play.

Recordings
Romulus – Katrina Thurman (Martha), Steven Ebel (Frantz Wolf), Thomas Meglioranza (Celestus), Wilbur Pauley (Mayor Babenhausen); The Washington Square Ensemble, Louis Karchin, Naxos Records

References

External links
Karchin: Romulus by Joshua Rosenblum, Opera News, January 2012, vol. 76, no. 7

Operas
2007 operas
Operas based on plays
Operas based on works by Alexandre Dumas
One-act operas
English-language operas